Juan José Óscar Siafá Etoha (born 12 September 1997), known as Óscar Siafá, is a professional footballer who plays as a forward for Greek club Niki Volos FC. Born in Spain, he represents the Equatorial Guinea national team.

Early life
Siafá was born in Madrid to Equatoguinean Bubi parents.

Club career
Siafá is a CF Fuenlabrada product. He has played for CD Móstoles URJC, Elche CF Ilicitano, CD Eldense, FC Cartagena, UD Alzira and CD Laredo in Spain.

International career
Siafá made his senior debut for Equatorial Guinea on 7 September 2021.

Career statistics

International

References

External links

1997 births
Living people
Citizens of Equatorial Guinea through descent
Equatoguinean footballers
Association football forwards
Equatorial Guinea international footballers
2021 Africa Cup of Nations players
Equatoguinean expatriate footballers
Equatoguinean expatriate sportspeople in Spain
Expatriate footballers in Spain
Equatoguinean expatriate sportspeople in Greece
Expatriate footballers in Greece
Bubi people
Footballers from Madrid
Spanish footballers
CF Fuenlabrada footballers
Elche CF Ilicitano footballers
CD Eldense footballers
FC Cartagena footballers
FC Cartagena B players
UD Alzira footballers
CD Laredo players
Olympiacos Volos F.C. players
Niki Volos F.C. players
Tercera División players
Segunda División B players
Super League Greece 2 players
Spanish expatriate footballers
Spanish expatriate sportspeople in Greece
Spanish sportspeople of Equatoguinean descent
Spanish people of Bubi descent